William McDonald (1892–1948) was an English footballer who played in the Football League for Durham City, Fulham and Hull City.

References

1892 births
1979 deaths
English footballers
Association football forwards
English Football League players
Craghead United F.C. players
Hull City A.F.C. players
Chesterfield F.C. players
Durham City A.F.C. players
Fulham F.C. players
Shirebrook Miners Welfare F.C. players
Alfreton Town F.C. players
Grantham Town F.C. players